Henry, Count of Nassau, Lord of Overkirk (Dutch: Hendrik van Nassau-Ouwerkerk, French: Henry de Nassau d'Auverquerque) (1640 – 18 October 1708) was a Dutch military general and second cousin of King William III of England and his Master of the Horse.  Lord of Ouwerkerk and Woudenberg in the Netherlands, he was called by the English "Lord Overkirk" or "Count Overkirk".

Life
Born in The Hague to Louis of Nassau-Beverweerd (illegitimate son of Maurice of Nassau, Prince of Orange) and his wife Isabella van Hoorn, Overkirk was baptised there on 16 December 1640. Granted the title Count of Nassau (graaf van Nassau) by the Emperor Leopold I in 1679, he joined William III's invasion of England in 1688, and was appointed the king's Master of the Horse the following year.  He resided in London, notably at Overkirk House, which later became part of 10 Downing Street.

Overkirk died on 18 October 1708 at Roeselare in modern-day Belgium and is buried the Nassau-LaLecq Crypt at Ouderkerk aan den IJssel, Netherlands. His widow continued to live at Overkirk House until her own death in 1720.

Military career

Already in his youth, Overkirk entered military service. He first took part in the Franco-Dutch War and was wounded in the Battle of Seneffe. Some time later, he saved William III's life in the Battle of Saint-Denis. Prince William, who himself was fighting in the thick of the action, was so close to the enemy that the knight d'Esclainvilliers was already putting a gun to his chest when Ouwerkerk shot the Frenchman out of his saddle. This act was gratefully acknowledged by the States-General, with the gift of an honour guard, magnificent pistols and golden ornaments. William immediately made him a captain, and since then he accompanied William on most of his campaigns.

In 1688 at the start of the Nine Years' War he accompanied William III during his invasion of England. He would take part in the Williamite War in Ireland and fight at the Battle of the Boyne. Back on the continent, he chased of the French cavalry at the Battle of Leuze. In 1692 he fought the French in the Battle of Steenkerque. The next year Overkirk achieved great fame as colonel of the Dutch bodyguard at the Battle of Landen, where he overran two French squadrons, passed through a third and obtained some standards and prisoners. In 1695 he served under the Prince de Vaudemont. He was made major-general on 16 March 1696 and general in 1697. William III, after naturalising him as an English citizen, made also made him Chief Marshal. 

In England, he met the Duke of Marlborough, under whom, and possibly on whose recommendation, he was appointed field marshal of the whole Dutch States Army during the War of the Spanish Succession, after the Earl of Athlone died. Marlborough appreciated Overkirk. His bravery was not rash, but firm and unwavering. Under Marlborough, he took part in almost every campaign and battle in the War of the Spanish Succession and remained his trusted partner. 

In 1702, he dissuaded Marlborough from his preferred plan to break through the French lines, for which he now believed he had better chances than ever, and in the campaign of 1703 he and the Dutch prevented the main French army from doing anything against Liège or Maastricht. In the campaign of 1704, Marlborough marched with a part of the Allied troops to the Danube to support the Holy Roman Emperor and fought the Battle of Blenheim there. Overkirk took the charge in the Low Countries and defended the Allied postition there without much difficulty. In 1705, he helped break the French lines of Brabant at the Battle of Elixheim. Afterwards he was the only major Dutch figure who supported Marlborough's plan to attack the French armies, which failed because of the deputies in the field, who where Dutch envoys attached to Marlborough's staff, and especially because of Slangenburg's opposition. The next year Overkrik had a major role in the victory at the Battle of Ramillies, where he fought in person at the head of the cavalry on the left wing. Here his generosity had almost cost him his life. When a Bavarian cavalryman surrendered, Overkirk let him keep his sabre. The Bavarian however, wanted to use it to stab the marshal, who had turned around. Just in time an Allied cavalryman noticed it and shot the Bavarian. After this, he participated in the Battle of Oudenarde where he played an important role by attacking the French army on their flank. Shortly afterwards he died during the Siege of Lille (1708).

Family

The future Lord Overkirk married Frances van Aerssen van Sommelsdijck (died 1720), daughter of Cornelius, Lord of Sommelsdijk, at The Hague on 2 October 1667.  They had eight children, including five sons, of whom two married and had children.

Their children included:
 Countess Isabella van Nassau (bapt. 20 April 1668, d.in childbirth on 30 January 1692 at London) married 10 March 1691, Charles Granville, Lord Lansdown, later 2nd Earl of Bath (bapt. 31 August 1661 – d. 4 September 1701 by suicide), widower of Lady Martha Osborne, daughter of the 1st Duke of Leeds, and son and heir of John Granville, 1st Earl of Bath. Her widower committed suicide on 4 September 1701, shortly after inheriting the peerage on 2 August 1701. He was buried with his father on 22 September 1701 at Kilkhampton. Her son, William Henry Granville] (30 January 1692 – 1711), became 3rd Earl of Granville, but died young aged 19 of smallpox.
 Lodewijk van Nassau (1669–1687)
 Lucia van Nassau (1671–1673)
 Henry Nassau d'Auverquerque, 1st Earl of Grantham (1673–1754) whose two sons both died in his lifetime, making his nephew Hendrik his heir as of 1730.
 Cornelis van Nassau, Heer van Woudenberg (1675–1712), drowned at the Battle of Denain
 Count , Heer van Ouwerkerk (1679–1753) who married his cousin Charlotte van Nassau (c. 1677–1708), and had issue one son and two daughters
 Count Hendrik van Nassau, styled Viscount Boston (1710 – 10 October 1735) who became heir to his uncle, the 1st Earl of Grantham, and as such was known as Viscount of Boston.
 Frans van Nassau (1682–1710), died in the Battle of Almenar
 Lucia Anna van Nassau (1684–1744) married 11 February 1705 Nanfan Coote, 2nd Earl of Bellomont, and had issue 1 daughter, Lady Frances Coote. She, in turn, married Sir Robert Clifton, 5th Baronet, of Clifton Hall, MP (1690–1767), and had one daughter Frances Clifton (d 8 November 1786) who married George Carpenter, 3rd Baron Carpenter, later 1st Earl of Tyrconnel (1723–1762) and had many children.

References
Reinildis van Ditzhuyzen, Oranje-Nassau: Een biografisch woordenboek, Haarlem 2004, 122-124 (with a portrait by G. Kneller, Oranje Nassau Museum)

Sources
 
 

1640 births
1708 deaths
Henry
Nassau-Ouwerkerk, Hendrik van
Nassau-Ouwerkerk, Hendrik van
Nassau-Ouwerkerk, Henry van
Lords of the Netherlands
Williamite military personnel of the Williamite War in Ireland
Dutch generals
Dutch military personnel of the Nine Years' War
17th-century Dutch military personnel
18th-century Dutch military personnel